Matthew Vincent Lattanzi (born February 1, 1959) is an American former actor and dancer. He is most commonly recognized as the first husband of singer and actress Dame Olivia Newton-John, and for his acting in films such as My Tutor and the soap opera Paradise Beach.

Personal life

Lattanzi was born and raised in Portland, Oregon, the son of Jeanette (née Slowikowski) and Charles Paul Lattanzi. His father was a maintenance foreman of Italian descent, while his mother is of Polish ancestry. He graduated from Benson Polytechnic High School in 1977.

While filming Xanadu (1980), Lattanzi met Olivia Newton-John, whom he married in 1984. The couple had one daughter, Chloe Rose Lattanzi, born on January 17, 1986. By 1993, his acting career was largely over, and he took a job as a contractor for a homebuilding company in California. Lattanzi and Newton-John moved to their farm in Australia in 1993 so that he could audition for the soap opera, Paradise Beach. He won a six-month contract for the show.

On April 24, 1995, Lattanzi and Newton-John announced their divorce. A year later, Olivia Newton-John would be in a relationship with Patrick Kim McDermott. McDermott disappeared in 2005, and was subsequently declared by the United States Coast Guard to have been lost at sea. From 1997 to 2007, Lattanzi was in a relationship with Cindy Jessup.

In 2008, Lattanzi briefly appeared in the MTV reality series Rock the Cradle, supporting his daughter Chloe (a contestant on the show). That same year, Lattanzi—a lifelong environmentalist—was reported to be living off the grid near Malibu, California. He now resides in Portland, Oregon.

Career
Lattanzi's feature film debut was as a dancer in the 1980 movie Xanadu.

Lattanzi's career consists mostly of small movie parts, though he did have a starring role in 1983's My Tutor.  Other film credits include Rich and Famous, Grease 2, That's Life!, Roxanne, Catch Me If You Can, and Diving In. Lattanzi also had a significant role in the Australian soap opera, Paradise Beach, and he appeared in four of Newton-John's music videos: "Landslide", "Soul Kiss", "Toughen Up" and "Can't We Talk It Over in Bed".

Filmography

References

External links

1959 births
Male actors from Portland, Oregon
American male film actors
American male television actors
American people of Italian descent
American people of Polish descent
Living people
Benson Polytechnic High School alumni